Instigators were an anarcho-punk band from Dewsbury, England, formed in 1980. The original line-up split up in the mid-1980s, but the band carried on into the 1990s.

History
The band was formed in 1980 by drummer Paul "Hammy" Halmshaw and guitarist Simon Mooney, both students at Thornhill High School, and the line-up was completed by Simon "Semi" Bridgewater (vocals) and Nicky Djorjevic (bass Guitar). They took the name Instigators on the suggestion of Ritchie Calvert of the band Disintegrated. The band's first live performance was in summer 1982. Influences on the band included Crass and Flux of Pink Indians.

Djorjevic left to be replaced by "Tompo", who only lasted a few months, playing on the band's first demo, before being replaced himself by Simon "Tab" Elsey. Bridgewater also left for a short time and later became a Web Developer, his replacement Daz Dean. The band's demo got the band a support slot for Flux of Pink Indians in November 1982, and they recorded two further demos, all three getting released on a cassette on Halmshaw's Peaceville Records label, gaining the band more fans. Barbara Drye also added some further input into the band by singing a couple of songs with 'Aggression' been one of them. The band were given another support slot in May 1983, opening for Subhumans in Bradford, a performance that was recorded by Subhumans vocalist Dick Lucas and released through his Bluurg label. Bluurg also released the band's first EP, The Blood is on Your Hands, which reached number 21 on the UK Independent Chart. The 1985 LP release Nobody Listens Anymore increased their popularity, reaching number 18 on the Indie Albums Chart, and securing them a spot on Pusmort's Cleanse the Bacteria compilation LP.

Bridgewater left later that year after an argument, and the band recruited Andy "Tez" Turner (formerly of Xpozez) as his replacement. Halmshaw and Elsey also soon left, with Mooney and Turner continuing with Andrew "Trimble" Turnbull (Also formerly of Xpozez) on bass guitar and Steve "Cuzzy" Curran on drums. The band's sound changed with the new line-up, taking on a more American influence. They went on to tour Europe and the United States and continued into the 1990s.

Halmshaw went on to front Civilised Society, and continued to develop his Peaceville label.

Discography

Singles, Eps
The Blood Is on Your Hands 7-inch EP (1984), Bluurg, Fish 6 - UK Indie No. 21
Recorded Live in Denmark Feb '86 7-inch EP (1986), Mystic
"Eye to Eye" (1986), Mystic
"Full Circle" 7-inch (1987), Double A
"Invasion" 7-inch (1988), Super Seven
"Toshiyuki Hiraoka/With The Instigators–Personal Progress" 7-inch (1990), Deco Record

Albums
Demo (cassette) (1982)
Demo (cassette) (1983)
Demo (cassette) (1984)
Live in Leeds (cassette) (1983), Bluurg
It Has To Be Stopped Live (cassette) (1984),  96 Tapes 
All Creatures Great And Small Live (cassette) (1984),  Bluurg
Nobody Listens Anymore (1985), Bluurg, Fish 11 - UK Indie No. 18
We Are The Race Of The Media Fix Live  (cassette), (1985) Bluurg
Shrapnel,  Instigators–Live At St.Phillips Community Centre. (cassette), (1985)
Live In Leeds(cassette), (1985)
Demo (cassette), (1986)
Phoenix (1986), Bluurg, Fish 13
Instigators Live At Huset, Arhus, Denmark, 15 February 1986 (1987), self-released, later licensed to Calypso Now
Wall of Sound - Live in Berlin (1988), Meantime
Live (1988) Black Box Records
Shockgun (1988), Flipside, FLIP 16
New Old Now (1989), Peaceville
Recovery Sessions (1990), Full Circle
Demo (cassette) (1993)
Dine Upon the Dead (2002), Blackfish - compilation
The Blood Is On Your Hands (LP) (2015), RuinNation
Nobody Listens Anymore (30th Anniversary Edition) (LP) (2015), RuinNation

References

External links
 Instigators Facebook Page

Punk rock groups from West Yorkshire
Musical groups established in 1980